Clyde was built by Russell & Company, Port Glasgow, Scotland, for the Nourse Line, and named after the River Clyde flowing through Glasgow, and launched on 25 July 1894. The Clyde was the last sailing ship built for the Nourse Line. She was primarily used for the transportation of Indian indentured labourers to the colonies. Details of some of these voyages are as follows:

On 9 March 1906 she ran aground at Cape Hatteras, en route from Barbados to New York. She was refloated on 9 May 1906 and taken to New York for repairs. On 31 July 1906 she was sold to M & G.R. Clover of London. She was resold a number of times to different Norwegian owners and broken up in 1924.

See also 
 Indian Indenture Ships to Fiji

External links 
The Ships List
Immigrant Ships Transcribers Guild: Trinidad

References 

History of Suriname
Indian indentureship in Trinidad and Tobago
Indian indenture ships to Fiji
Individual sailing vessels
Victorian-era passenger ships of the United Kingdom
Merchant ships of Norway
Ships built on the River Clyde
1894 ships